John Marratt Taylor (18191911) was an English first-class cricketer and clergyman.

The son of John Taylor senior, he was born at Sunninghill in 1819. After receiving a private education, he went up to Magdalene College, Cambridge. While studying at Cambridge, he played two first-class cricket matches for Cambridge University Cricket Club at Parker's Piece in 1844, against the Marylebone Cricket Club and Cambridge Town and County Club. He scored 29 runs with a highest score of 15 not out, in addition to taking 2 wickets.

After graduating from Cambridge, he was ordained into the Church of England as a deacon at Chester Cathedral in 1845, before becoming a priest in 1846. He later became an assistant master at Ipswich School, a appointment he held in 1859 and 1860. From there he moved to the West Country, where he became curate of Cannington from 1860 to 1865. From there he was appointed curate at Burton in Dorset until 1868, before becoming curate at Walditch until 1870. Taylor moved to the home counties in 1870, where he spent 30 years as vicar of Seer Green in Buckinghamshire. In retirement he remained in Buckinghamshire at Jordans, later passing away at High Wycombe in 1911.

References

External links

1819 births
1911 deaths
People from Sunninghill
Alumni of Magdalene College, Cambridge
English cricketers
Cambridge University cricketers
19th-century English Anglican priests
Schoolteachers from Berkshire
20th-century English Anglican priests